The Jägala is a  long river in northern Estonia that flows into the Gulf of Finland in Jõesuu, Harju county.

The river runs mostly north-west and through Järva and Harju counties. Jägala waterfall, the highest waterfall in Estonia, is located on the river.

Several reservoirs are located on the river. Kehra pulp mill is located on the left bank of the river. The river is part of the Tallinn water supply system.

The river contains populations of trout and grayling.

See also
List of rivers of Estonia

References

Rivers of Estonia
Landforms of Harju County
Landforms of Ida-Viru County